An administrative consul is a type of powerful diplomat. Under certain historical circumstances, a major power's consular representation would take on various degrees of administrative roles, not unlike a colonial resident minister. This would often occur in territories without a formal state government (thus warranting a full diplomatic mission, such as an embassy).

Protectorates
When a state falls under the "amical" protection of a stronger (often colonial) power, the latter is usually represented by a high ranking diplomatic and/or gubernatorial officer, such as a Resident general, Resident Minister or High Commissioner. However, if there is no such representation (in modern terms often at ambassadorial level), the task may fall to the only available "diplomatic" alternative: consular representation.

Africa
In German Kamerun, 6 July 1884 – 26 June 1885, provisional consul Heinrich Randad filled the void between the first Reichskommissar (titled—for West Africa, 5–6 July 1884 only) and the subsequent series of regular incumbents

In parts of present Nigeria, British Consuls were in charge of the following West African protectorates:
the Bight of Benin May 1852–6 August 1861
the Bight of Biafra 30 June 1849 – 6 August 1861
the Bights of Biafra and Benin after the merger of the two above on 6 August 1861; the last incumbent was promoted on 5 June 1885 to stay on as first Consul general (of two) of the Bight.

Samoa
From 7 November 1889, Samoa, previously a Polynesian kingdom, was governed by the joint German-British-U.S. Samoa Tripartite Convention, which made Samoa a protectorate of those three powers.  On 10 June 1899, a provisional (colonial) government sui generis was formed, consisting of the consuls of the three protecting powers:
 Friedrich Rose (German Consul)  (b. 1855–d. 1922)
 Ernest George Berkeley Maxse (British Consul) (b. 1863–d. 1943): to 23 June 1899, succeeded by a Mister Nair (acting British consul)
 Luther Wood Osborn (U.S. Consul) (b. 1843–d. 1901).

This arrangement lasted until 1 March 1900, when most of the archipelago was annexed by Imperial Germany. The eastern islands remained under U.S. control and became the territory of American Samoa.

Tonga
On Tonga, a British protectorate from 1900, the British Empire was only represented by its consuls from 1901 until Tongan independence in 1970. From 1901 until 1952, the protectorate was also under the administrative authority of the High Commissioner of the British Western Pacific Territories, who was always the British Governor of Fiji.

Occupied territories under similar control
In the Suez Canal Zone, even before it was officially established under that name in 1936 (from then on with a formal Governor in charge), the British were represented since 1922 by Vice Consuls in Port Suez, the last of which stayed on in 1941 as first of several Consuls till the 1956 Egyptian nationalisation.
From December 1941 to August 1945, Japanese troops invaded the Portuguese colony of Macau several times, giving the Japanese control over the access of people and goods. This made it by 1943 a virtual protectorate, with Japanese consul Fukui Yasumitsu controlling all contact until 1945 with the Portuguese governor, Gabriel Maurício Teixeira.

Similar functions have been performed elsewhere by consular officers of other ranks: Consular Agent, Honorary Consul and Consul general.

U.S. military personnel 
Certain U.S. military personnel also have statutory authority to act as consuls for its military administration purposes, more broadly for its military personnel and dependents, and for its merchant seamen in a port lacking an accredited U.S. consul.

The US assigns a military-equivalent rank to its Honorary (Vice) Consuls (General). Its honorary consular Officers rank immediately after Naval Lieutenants, Captains, and Flight Lieutenants; Honorary Vice Consuls after Lieutenant Commanders, Majors, and Squadron Leaders; Honorary Consuls after Naval Captains, Colonels, and Group Captains; and Honorary Consuls General after Rear Admirals, Major Generals and Air Vice Marshals. This is done in order to "cut to the chase", i.e. in a sensitive situation to get the Consul (of whatever rank) to someone with whom he/she can negotiate with confidence.

See also
 Consul
 Consul (representative)
 Consul general
 Consular Agent
 Honorary Consul

References

International law
Diplomacy
History of colonialism